The Squaw Man or A Squaw Man may refer to:

The Squaw Man (play) (1905), by Edwin Milton Royle
The Squaw Man (novel) (1907), adapted by Julie Opp Faversham from the play
, a 1912 silent movie
The Squaw Man (1914 film), a silent movie version of the play
The Squaw Man (1918 film), a silent movie remake
The Squaw Man (1931 film), a sound movie version
The Squawman (1973 episode), second season of [[Kung Fu (1972 TV series)|Kung Fu (1972) TV series]]

See also

 The Squaw Man's Son'' (1917 film) U.S. western silent film
 Squaw (disambiguation)
 Man (disambiguation)